Konopielka is a 1982 Polish drama film directed by Witold Leszczyński.

Cast 
 Krzysztof Majchrzak − Kaziuk Bartoszewicz
 Anna Seniuk − Handzia
 Joanna Sienkiewicz − Nauczycielka Jola
 Tomasz Jarosiński − Ziutek
 Jerzy Block − Józef
 Franciszek Pieczka − Dziad / Bóg
 Jan Paweł Kruk − Dunaj
 Tadeusz Wojtych − Domin
 Sylwester Maciejewski − Żołnierz w motorówce

References

External links 

1982 drama films
1982 films
Polish comedy films
Films based on Polish novels
Polish black-and-white films